James Farish Farrer (6 January 1876 – 6 July 1967) was an Australian politician.

He was born in Modewarre, where he attended state school before qualifying as a woolclasser. He became a grazier at Modewarre and later at Pirron Yallock, and on 28 February 1914 married Alice Annie Jenkins, with whom he had two sons. In 1906 he won a by-election for the Victorian Legislative Assembly seat of Barwon. A Liberal, he served until his defeat in 1917. Farrer retired around 1929 and died in Richmond in 1967.

References

1876 births
1967 deaths
Nationalist Party of Australia members of the Parliament of Victoria
Members of the Victorian Legislative Assembly